KBS Nine O'Clock News (Also known as KBS News 9 (KBS 뉴스9 in Korean)) is the flagship newscast aired on KBS1 every night at 9:00pm KST. The program is seen across South Korea, as well as on KBS World service which provides headline tickers in English throughout the newscast. The newscast has news, sports, weather, health, society, as well as other topics. It first premiered on August 31, 1964 as a short news bulletin, but it later expanded and became KBS News 9, which premiered on May 22, 1973.

KBS Sports 9/Local Window at 9:30

Between 9:30 and 9:35 pm, local KBS stations outside Seoul opt-out from the national newscast to provide a 15-minute regional newscast in their respective areas. At around 9:45, all stations rejoin Seoul for KBS Sports 9, a sub-newscast airing Korean and international sports news, to be followed by the national weather.

Anchors
Lee So-jung and Lee Young-ho currently anchor the weekday edition, while Lee Jae-seok and Park Ji-won helm the weekend edition. Nam Hyun-jong does the sports news on weekdays, and Kim Sung-geun does it on weekends. The weather forecast is presented by Kang Ah-rang on weekdays and Saturdays, while Noh Eun-ji does it on Sundays.

Broadcast times 
9:00 pm - KBS1, KBS NEWS D (Nationwide)
9:00 pm KST - KBS World TV (Worldwide)
9:00-9:40 pm - KBS Radio 1, KBS Radio 3, KBS Hanminjok Radio, KBS 1FM (Nationwide Radio Simulcast)

External links
 KBS News 9 Official Site 

Korean Broadcasting System original programming
South Korean television news shows
Flagship evening news shows